Brandon Lamont Moore (born June 3, 1980) is a former American football guard who spent his 10-year career playing for the New York Jets of the National Football League (NFL). He was signed by the Jets as an undrafted free agent in 2002 after playing college football at the University of Illinois. Moore was to sign with the Dallas Cowboys during the 2013 season but opted to retire.

College career
Moore attended the University of Illinois at Urbana–Champaign, where he played defensive tackle. Moore was a starter for the Fighting Illini for three seasons, and was named All-Big Ten in his senior season. Moore graduated from Illinois with a bachelor's degree in English.

Professional career

New York Jets
Moore signed with the New York Jets as an undrafted free agent on April 26, 2002.  After spending time with the practice squad and with the Scottish Claymores, as well as with the Carolina Cobras of the Arena Football League, Moore first saw action in 2003, appearing in three games and starting one.  Moore started 13 games in 2004, helping running back Curtis Martin lead the NFL in rushing yards. The Jets released Moore on February 26, 2009; however, he was re-signed the next day.

After being considered one of the top guards in the NFL for several years, Moore was finally selected to his first Pro Bowl after the 2011–2012 season.

Moore is probably most known for his role in the infamous "Butt fumble" against the New England Patriots on Thanksgiving Day 2012. On the play, Jets quarterback Mark Sanchez face planted into Moore's rear-end and fumbled the ball, and it was returned for a touchdown by Steve Gregory.

Dallas Cowboys
On August 7, 2013, Moore signed a one-year deal with the Dallas Cowboys. Shortly after, he announced his retirement saying that he "could not bring himself to get on a plane and leave his family".

Personal life
His brother Julian played football at Central State University in Wilberforce, Ohio.

References

External links
 Illinois Fighting illini bio
 New York Jets bio

Living people
1980 births
Players of American football from Gary, Indiana
African-American players of American football
American football offensive guards
Illinois Fighting Illini football players
New York Jets players
Scottish Claymores players
Carolina Cobras players
American Conference Pro Bowl players
Sportspeople from the Chicago metropolitan area
Ed Block Courage Award recipients